Michelle de Saubonne, Madame de Soubise (1485–1549) was a French courtier who served as lady-in-waiting to Anne of Brittany, as the Governess of the Children of France, and as the governess for the children of Ercole II d'Este, Duke of Ferrara. She was dismissed from her court duties due to being a Huguenot.

Biography 
Michelle de Saubonne was born in 1485 to humanist and nobleman Denis de Saubonne, Lord of Fresnes-Coudray. 

In 1505 she was chosen to serve as a companion of Anne of Brittany and was charged with taking care of the queen's jewels and linens. She shared the role of queen's secretary with Hélène de Laval. She was instrumental in bringing Jean Marot to the French court, whose poems were admired by the queen. She also introduced the queen to other writers of that time, including Jean Lemaire de Belges. In 1508 she married Jean IV of Parthenay, Lord of Soubise. She was Parthenay's second wife. He died five years later. Through her son, Jean V de Parthenay, she is the grandmother of mathematician Catherine de Parthenay. In 1510 she was appointed by Louis XII to the post of Governess of the Children of France. As royal governess, she was in charge of the education of the king and queen's youngest daughter, Renée of France.

She was banished from court in 1515 by Francis I of France for opposing the annexation of Brittany to the French crown, and for her support for Anne of Brittany over Louise of Savoy. She left the court with her four children and lived at her home in Park-Soubise, where she taught them Greek and Latin and instructed them in Christian teachings.

In 1528 she was invited to the Court of Ferrara by her former pupil, Renée de France, who had married Ercole II d'Este, Duke of Ferrara. She was appointed as governess for the two daughters and son of the Duke of Ferrara. Renée de France and her children began practicing Calvinism, despite the Counter-Reformation taking place in Ferrara. Ercole II did not approve of French influence at his court and had all French nobles dismissed, including de Saubonne. She returned to France and lived in Saintonge. She died in 1549 in Saintonge.

References 

1485 births
1549 deaths
15th-century French women
15th-century French people
16th-century French women
French ladies-in-waiting
French maids of honour
Governesses to the Children of France
Huguenots
Medieval French nobility